Preston County is a county located in the U.S. state of West Virginia. As of the 2020 Census, the population was 34,216. Its county seat is Kingwood. The county was formed from Monongalia County in 1818 and named for Virginia Governor James Patton Preston.

Preston County is part of the Morgantown, WV Metropolitan Statistical Area, and is the southernmost county of the Pittsburgh media market. It is the home of The Buckwheat Festival, a county fair known for making buckwheat pancakes.

History
Native Americans lived in and traveled through what became Preston County as they crossed from the Ohio River watershed (which drains into the Mississippi River), into the Chesapeake Bay watershed. Although white traders and explorers also lived in the county after 1736, and one boundary stone (the Fairfax Stone marking the limits of the North Branch of the River) was laid in 1746, white settlers began arriving in 1766. Traveling by foot or horseback, settlers established log cabins after the American Revolutionary War. Further development ensued after 1818, when the National Road was built slightly to the north. When the earliest railroads came in 1851, all land passed into private ownership, population increased 70% in a decade, and industrialization began.

During the American Civil War, more Preston County men enlisted in Union service than with the Confederacy. There were few slave-holders in Preston County, and relatively few slaves, almost none outside a half-hour walk from the Clarksburg to Winchester road that dated back to the late colonial era. The census indicates that slavery's high-water mark in Preston County occurred in 1830, when the county included 125 slaves, alongside 27 free colored persons.

On June 20, 1863, Preston was one of fifty Virginia counties that were admitted to the Union as the state of West Virginia.  Later that year, the counties were divided into civil townships, with the intention of encouraging local government.  This proved impractical in the heavily rural state, and in 1872 the townships were converted into magisterial districts.  Preston County was divided into eight districts: Grant, Kingwood, Lyon, Pleasant, Portland, Reno, Union, and Valley.  These remained largely unchanged until the 1990s, when they were consolidated into five new magisterial districts: First, Second, Third, Fourth, and Fifth.

Geography

Major highways

 Interstate 68
 U.S. Highway 50
 U.S. Route 219
 West Virginia Route 7
 West Virginia Route 24
 West Virginia Route 26
 West Virginia Route 72
 West Virginia Route 92

Adjacent counties
Fayette County, Pennsylvania (north)
Garrett County, Maryland (east)
Tucker County (south)
Barbour County (southwest)
Taylor County (west)
Monongalia County (northwest)
Grant County (southeast)

National protected area
Monongahela National Forest (part)

State parks
 Cathedral State Park (also a Registered National Natural Landmark)
 Fairfax Stone State Park

Demographics

2010 census
As of the 2010 United States census, there were 33,520 people, 12,895 households, and 9,038 families residing in the county. The racial makeup of the county was 97.6% white, 1.1% black or African American, 0.2% American Indian, 0.1% Asian, 0.2% from other races, and 0.8% from two or more races. Those of Hispanic or Latino origin made up 0.7% of the population. In terms of ancestry, 29.4% were German, 14.3% were Irish, 9.5% were American, and 8.9% were English.

Of the 12,895 households, 29.0% had children under the age of 18 living with them, 56.1% were married couples living together, 9.1% had a female householder with no husband present, 29.9% were non-families, and 24.6% of all households were made up of individuals. The average household size was 2.42 and the average family size was 2.84. The median age was 42.0 years.

The age distribution was 19.55% under the age of 18, 7.36% from 18 to 24, 27.58% from 25 to 44, 29.83% from 45 to 64, and 15.68% who were 65 years of age or older.  The median age was 42.0 years. For every 100 females, there were 106.63 males.  For every 100 females age 18 and over, there were 106.48 males.

The median income for a household in the county was $40,753 and the median income for a family was $46,622. Males had a median income of $38,713 versus $25,808 for females. The per capita income for the county was $19,329. About 10.1% of families and 13.9% of the population were below the poverty line, including 19.0% of those under age 18 and 9.9% of those age 65 or over.

Politics
Whereas most of West Virginia has become a Republican bastion in the 21st century after having leaned heavily Democratic between the New Deal and Bill Clinton, Preston County has always been a Republican stronghold, if not quite so rock-ribbed as neighboring Grant County or Garrett County, Maryland. Those two counties have never voted for a Democrat since being created after the Civil War, whereas Preston County has voted Democratic on one occasion since then, during Lyndon Johnson’s 1964 landslide – although Johnson’s win over Barry Goldwater was much more decisive than his narrow victory in analogous Upshur County, and Bill Clinton came within 20 votes in 1996.

Communities

City
Kingwood

Towns

Albright
Brandonville
Bruceton Mills
Masontown
Newburg
Reedsville
Rowlesburg
Terra Alta
Tunnelton

Magisterial districts

Current

First
Second
Third
Fourth
Fifth

Historic

Grant
Kingwood
Lyon
Pleasant
Portland
Reno
Union
Valley

Census-designated place
Aurora

Unincorporated communities

Afton
Alpine Lake
Amboy
Arthurdale
Austen
Borgman
Bretz
Bull Run
Cascade
Clifton Mills
Colebank
Corinth
Cuzzart
Denver
Eglon
Etam
Evansville
Fellowsville
Gladefarms
Hardman (partial)
Hazelton
Herring
Hopemont
Hopewell
Horse Shoe Run
Howesville
Independence
Lenox
Little Sandy
Manheim
Macomber
Manown
Marquess
Mount Olivet
Mount Vernon
Orr
Pisgah
Pleasantdale
Preston
Rockville
Rodemer
Rohr
Ruthbelle
Saint Joe
Scotch Hill
Sell
Silver Lake
Sinclair
Snider
Stevensburg
Sugar Valley
Threefork Bridge
Turner Douglass
Valley Point
Victoria
West End
White Oak Springs
Zevely

See also
Briery Mountain Wildlife Management Area
National Register of Historic Places listings in Preston County, West Virginia
Maryland v. West Virginia
Snake Hill Wildlife Management Area
Upper Deckers Creek Wildlife Management Area

References

Further reading
 Cox, Connie Loraine, Our Place In History: Southwestern Preston County, West Virginia, Headline Books, Terra Alta, WV, 2005. (Written and oral histories, photographs)

External links
Preston County Commission

 
1818 establishments in Virginia
Counties of Appalachia
Morgantown metropolitan area
Populated places established in 1818
Northwestern Turnpike
West Virginia counties on the Potomac River